The 2022–23 Philadelphia 76ers season is the 74th season for the franchise in the National Basketball Association (NBA).

Draft 

The 76ers entered the draft holding their first round pick. They owe two second-round picks at 50th to the Minnesota Timberwolves that the Denver Nuggets previously owned and at 51st to the Golden State Warriors that the Toronto Raptors previously owned. They initially owed another second-round pick to the Miami Heat that they initially acquired from the Nuggets, but the pick was forfeited after the league found that they violated tampering rules with Kyle Lowry in free agency.

Roster

Standings

Division

Conference

Game log

Preseason 

|-style="background:#cfc;"
| 1
| October 3
| @ Brooklyn
| 
| Tyrese Maxey (20)
| Charles Bassey (9)
| Harris, Korkmaz (4)
| Barclays Center13,250
| 1–0
|-style="background:#cfc;"
| 2
| October 5
| Cleveland
| 
| Tyrese Maxey (21)
| Embiid, Korkmaz, Reed (6)
| Harden, Milton (5)
| Wells Fargo Center19,793
| 2–0
|-style="background:#cfc;"
| 3
| October 10
| @ Cleveland
| 
| Tyrese Maxey (19)
| Tobias Harris (7)
| De'Anthony Melton (5)
| Rocket Mortgage FieldHouse13,648
| 3–0
|-style="background:#cfc;"
| 4
| October 12
| Charlotte
| 
| Joel Embiid (19)
| Embiid, Harrell (6)
| James Harden (5)
| Wells Fargo Center19,778
| 4–0

Regular season

|-style="background:#fcc;"
| 1
| October 18
| @ Boston
| 
| James Harden (35)
| Joel Embiid (15)
| James Harden (7)
| TD Garden19,156
| 0–1
|-style="background:#fcc;"
| 2
| October 20
| Milwaukee
| 
| James Harden (31)
| Joel Embiid (12)
| James Harden (9)
| Wells Fargo Center20,060
| 0–2
|-style="background:#fcc;"
| 3
| October 22
| San Antonio
| 
| Joel Embiid (40)
| Joel Embiid (13)
| James Harden (12)
| Wells Fargo Center19,822
| 0–3
|-style="background:#cfc;"
| 4
| October 24
| Indiana
| 
| James Harden (29)
| James Harden (9)
| James Harden (11)
| Wells Fargo Center19,786
| 1–3
|-style="background:#fcc;"
| 5
| October 26
| @ Toronto
| 
| Embiid, Maxey (31)
| Tobias Harris (8)
| James Harden (9)
| Scotiabank Arena19,800
| 1–4
|-style="background:#cfc;"
| 6
| October 28
| @ Toronto
| 
| Tyrese Maxey (44)
| Tyrese Maxey (8)
| De'Anthony Melton (6)
| Scotiabank Arena19,800
| 2–4
|-style="background:#cfc;"
| 7
| October 29
| @ Chicago
| 
| Joel Embiid (25)
| Joel Embiid (7)
| James Harden (11)
| United Center19,010
| 3–4
|-style="background:#cfc;"
| 8
| October 31
| @ Washington
| 
| Tyrese Maxey (28)
| James Harden (7)
| James Harden (17)
| Capital One Arena13,746
| 4–4

|-style="background:#fcc;"
| 9
| November 2
| Washington
| 
| Tyrese Maxey (32)
| Tobias Harris (9)
| James Harden (10)
| Wells Fargo Center19,855
| 4–5
|-style="background:#fcc;"
| 10
| November 4
| New York
| 
| Tyrese Maxey (31)
| Tobias Harris (9)
| De'Anthony Melton (9)
| Wells Fargo Center20,679
| 4–6
|-style="background:#cfc;"
| 11
| November 7
| Phoenix
| 
| Joel Embiid (33)
| Joel Embiid (10)
| Harris, Maxey (6)
| Wells Fargo Center20,347
| 5–6
|-style="background:#fcc;"
| 12
| November 10
| @ Atlanta
| 
| Joel Embiid (26)
| Joel Embiid (13)
| Tyrese Maxey (5)
| State Farm Arena16,066
| 5–7
|-style="background:#cfc;"
| 13
| November 12
| Atlanta
| 
| Joel Embiid (42)
| Joel Embiid (10)
| Tyrese Maxey (9)
| Wells Fargo Center20,245
| 6–7
|-style="background:#cfc;"
| 14
| November 13
| Utah
| 
| Joel Embiid (59)
| Joel Embiid (11)
| Joel Embiid (8)
| Wells Fargo Center19,761
| 7–7
|-style="background:#cfc;"
| 15
| November 18
| Milwaukee
| 
| Joel Embiid (32)
| Joel Embiid (11)
| Joel Embiid (8)
| Wells Fargo Center19,769
| 8–7
|-style="background:#fcc;"
| 16
| November 19
| Minnesota
| 
| Joel Embiid (32)
| Joel Embiid (9)
| Embiid, Melton (6)
| Wells Fargo Center20,515
| 8–8
|-style="background:#cfc;"
| 17
| November 22
| Brooklyn
| 
| Tobias Harris (24)
| Paul Reed (10)
| Shake Milton (5)
| Wells Fargo Center20,184
| 9–8
|-style="background:#fcc;"
| 18
| November 23
| @ Charlotte
| 
| Shake Milton (22)
| Paul Reed (8)
| Shake Milton (9)
| Spectrum Center16,910
| 9–9
|-style="background:#cfc;"
| 19
| November 25
| @ Orlando
| 
| Shake Milton (24)
| Tobias Harris (10)
| Shake Milton (10)
| Amway Center15,384
| 10–9
|-style="background:#cfc;"
| 20
| November 27
| @ Orlando
| 
| Shake Milton (29)
| Paul Reed (13)
| Shake Milton (7)
| Amway Center16,218
| 11–9
|-style="background:#cfc;"
| 21
| November 28
| Atlanta
| 
| Joel Embiid (30)
| Tobias Harris (10)
| Embiid, Milton (7)
| Wells Fargo Center19,778
| 12–9
|-style="background:#fcc;"
| 22
| November 30
| @ Cleveland
| 
| Joel Embiid (19)
| Joel Embiid (6)
| Joel Embiid (6)
| Rocket Mortgage FieldHouse19,432
| 12–10

|-style="background:#fcc;"
| 23
| December 2
| @ Memphis
| 
| Joel Embiid (35)
| Joel Embiid (12)
| Joel Embiid (8)
| FedExForum17,022
| 12–11
|-style="background:#fcc;"
| 24
| December 5
| @ Houston
| 
| Joel Embiid (39)
| De'Anthony Melton (8)
| James Harden (7)
| Toyota Center15,331
| 12–12
|-style="background:#cfc;"
| 25
| December 9
| L.A. Lakers
| 
| Joel Embiid (38)
| Joel Embiid (12)
| James Harden (12)
| Wells Fargo Center20,852
| 13–12
|-style="background:#cfc;"
| 26
| December 11
| Charlotte
| 
| Joel Embiid (53)
| Joel Embiid (12)
| James Harden (16)
| Wells Fargo Center19,765
| 14–12
|-style="background:#cfc;"
| 27
| December 13
| Sacramento
| 
| Joel Embiid (31)
| Embiid, Harden, Harris (7)
| James Harden (15)
| Wells Fargo Center19,768
| 15–12
|-style="background:#cfc;"
| 28
| December 16
| Golden State
| 
| Joel Embiid (34)
| Joel Embiid (13)
| James Harden (9)
| Wells Fargo Center20,567
| 16–12
|-style="background:#cfc;"
| 29
| December 19
| Toronto
| 
| Joel Embiid (28)
| Joel Embiid (11)
| James Harden (8)
| Wells Fargo Center20,408
| 17–12
|-style="background:#cfc;"
| 30
| December 21
| Detroit
| 
| Joel Embiid (22)
| Embiid, Tucker (10)
| James Harden (8)
| Wells Fargo Center20,615
| 18–12
|-style="background:#cfc;"
| 31
| December 23
| L.A. Clippers
| 
| Joel Embiid (44)
| James Harden (11)
| James Harden (21)
| Wells Fargo Center19,996
| 19–12
|-style="background:#cfc;"
| 32
| December 25
| @ New York
| 
| Joel Embiid (35)
| Joel Embiid (8)
| James Harden (13)
| Madison Square Garden19,812
| 20–12
|-style="background:#fcc;"
| 33
| December 27
| @ Washington
| 
| Joel Embiid (48)
| Joel Embiid (10)
| James Harden (13)
| Capital One Arena20,476
| 20–13
|-style="background:#fcc;"
| 34
| December 30
| @ New Orleans
| 
| Joel Embiid (37)
| Joel Embiid (8)
| James Harden (10)
| Smoothie King Center18,656
| 20–14
|-style="background:#cfc;"
| 35
| December 31
| @ Oklahoma City
| 
| Tobias Harris (23)
| Joel Embiid (13)
| Joel Embiid (10)
| Paycom Center17,147
| 21–14

|-style="background:#cfc;"
| 36
| January 2
| New Orleans
| 
| Joel Embiid (42)
| Joel Embiid (11)
| James Harden (8)
| Wells Fargo Center20,531
| 22–14
|-style="background:#cfc;"
| 37
| January 4
| Indiana
| 
| James Harden (26)
| Tobias Harris (10)
| James Harden (8)
| Wells Fargo Center20,033
| 23–14
|-style="background:#fcc;"
| 38
| January 6
| Chicago
| 
| Tyrese Maxey (26)
| Tobias Harris (11)
| James Harden (11)
| Wells Fargo Center20,766
| 23–15
|-style="background:#cfc;"
| 39
| January 8
| @ Detroit
| 
| Tyrese Maxey (23)
| Paul Reed (12)
| James Harden (11)
| Little Caesars Arena18,898
| 24–15
|-style="background:#cfc;"
| 40
| January 10
| Detroit
| 
| Joel Embiid (36)
| James Harden (12)
| James Harden (15)
| Wells Fargo Center20,221
| 25–15
|-style="background:#fcc;"
| 41
| January 12
| Oklahoma City
| 
| Joel Embiid (30)
| Joel Embiid (10)
| James Harden (15)
| Wells Fargo Center20,892
| 25–16
|-style="background:#cfc"
| 42
| January 14
| @ Utah
| 
| Joel Embiid (30)
| Joel Embiid (7)
| James Harden (11)
| Vivint Arena18,206
| 26–16
|-style="background:#cfc;"
| 43
| January 15
| @ L.A. Lakers
| 
| Joel Embiid (35)
| Joel Embiid (11)
| James Harden (13)
| Crypto.com Arena18,020
| 27–16
|-style="background:#cfc;"
| 44
| January 17
| @ L.A. Clippers
| 
| Joel Embiid (40)
| Joel Embiid (9)
| James Harden (9)
| Crypto.com Arena15,155
| 28–16
|-style="background:#cfc;"
| 45
| January 19
| @ Portland
| 
| Joel Embiid (32)
| James Harden (10)
| James Harden (14)
| Moda Center18,113
| 29–16
|-style="background:#cfc;"
| 46
| January 21
| @ Sacramento
| 
| Tyrese Maxey (32)
| Harrell, Melton (7)
| Shake Milton (7)
| Golden 1 Center17,861
| 30–16
|-style="background:#cfc;"
| 47
| January 25
| Brooklyn
| 
| Tyrese Maxey (27)
| Joel Embiid (10)
| James Harden (7)
| Wells Fargo Center19,772
| 31–16
|-style="background:#cfc;"
| 48
| January 28
| Denver
| 
| Joel Embiid (47)
| Joel Embiid (18)
| James Harden (13)
| Wells Fargo Center21,255
| 32–16
|-style="background:#fcc;"
| 49
| January 30
| Orlando
| 
| Joel Embiid (30)
| Joel Embiid (11)
| Joel Embiid (5)
| Wells Fargo Center19,812
| 32–17

|-style="background:#cfc;"
| 50
| February 1
| Orlando
| 
| Joel Embiid (28)
| Joel Embiid (11)
| James Harden (10)
| Wells Fargo Center20,885
| 33–17
|-style="background:#cfc;"
| 51
| February 3
| @ San Antonio
| 
| Joel Embiid (33)
| Joel Embiid (10)
| James Harden (8)
| AT&T Center15,252
| 34–17
|-style="background:#fcc;"
| 52
| February 5
| @ New York
| 
| Joel Embiid (31)
| Joel Embiid (14)
| James Harden (12)
| Madison Square Garden17,586
| 34–18
|-style="background:#fcc;"
| 53
| February 8
| @ Boston
| 
| Joel Embiid (28)
| Joel Embiid (7)
| James Harden (11)
| TD Garden19,156
| 34–19
|-style="background:#cfc;"
| 54
| February 10
| New York
| 
| Joel Embiid (35)
| Joel Embiid (11)
| James Harden (12)
| Wells Fargo Center21,057
| 35–19
|-style="background:#cfc;"
| 55
| February 11
| @ Brooklyn
| 
| Joel Embiid (37)
| Joel Embiid (13)
| James Harden (6)
| Barclays Center17,732
| 36–19
|-style="background:#cfc;"
| 56
| February 13
| Houston
| 
| James Harden (28)
| Embiid, Harris (6)
| James Harden (10)
| Wells Fargo Center19,850
| 37–19
|-style="background:#cfc;"
| 57
| February 15
| Cleveland
| 
| Joel Embiid (29)
| Joel Embiid (14)
| James Harden (12)
| Wells Fargo Center21,134
| 38–19
|-style="background:#cfc;"
| 58
| February 23
| Memphis
| 
| James Harden (31)
| Joel Embiid (19)
| James Harden (7)
| Wells Fargo Center21,205
| 39–19
|-style="background:#fcc;"
| 59
| February 25
| Boston
| 
| Joel Embiid (41)
| P. J. Tucker (16)
| James Harden (8)
| Wells Fargo Center20,993
| 39–20
|-style="background:#fcc;"
| 60
| February 27
| Miami
| 
| Joel Embiid (27)
| Joel Embiid (12)
| James Harden (12)
| Wells Fargo Center20,859
| 39–21

|-style="background:#cfc;"
| 61
| March 1
| @ Miami
| 
| Tyrese Maxey (27)
| Paul Reed (14)
| Tyrese Maxey (7)
| Miami-Dade Arena19,600
| 40–21
|-style="background:#fcc;"
| 62
| March 2
| @ Dallas
| 
| Joel Embiid (35)
| Joel Embiid (8)
| James Harden (13)
| American Airlines Center20,002
| 40–22
|-style="background:#cfc;"
| 63
| March 4
| @ Milwaukee
| 
| James Harden (38)
| James Harden (9)
| Embiid, Harden (10)
| Fiserv Forum18,100
| 41–22
|-style="background:#cfc;"
| 64
| March 6
| @ Indiana
| 
| Joel Embiid (42)
| James Harden (9)
| James Harden (20)
| Gainbridge Fieldhouse15,008
| 42–22
|-style="background:#cfc;"
| 65
| March 7
| @ Minnesota
| 
| Joel Embiid (39)
| Tobias Harris (14)
| Maxey, Milton (5)
| Target Center17,136
| 43–22
|-style="background:#cfc;"
| 66
| March 10
| Portland
| 
| Joel Embiid (39)
| James Harden (9)
| James Harden (8)
| Wells Fargo Center21,001
| 44–22
|-style="background:#cfc;"
| 67
| March 12
| Washington
| 
| Joel Embiid (34)
| Joel Embiid (8)
| James Harden (14)
| Wells Fargo Center21,220
| 45–22
|-style="background:#cfc;"
| 68
| March 15
| @ Cleveland
| 
| Joel Embiid (36)
| Joel Embiid (18)
| James Harden (12)
| Rocket Mortgage FieldHouse19,432
| 46–22
|-style="background:#cfc;"
| 69
| March 17
| @ Charlotte
| 
| Joel Embiid (38)
| Joel Embiid (13)
| James Harden (10)
| Spectrum Center19,096
| 47–22
|-style="background:#cfc;"
| 70
| March 18
| @ Indiana
| 
| Embiid, Maxey (31)
| Joel Embiid (7)
| Embiid, Maxey (7)
| Gainbridge Fieldhouse17,274
| 48–22
|-style="background:#;"
| 71
| March 20
| Chicago
| 
| 
| 
| 
| Wells Fargo Center
|
|-style="background:#;"
| 72
| March 22
| @ Chicago
| 
| 
| 
| 
| United Center
|
|-style="background:#;"
| 73
| March 24
| @ Golden State
| 
| 
| 
| 
| Chase Center
|
|-style="background:#;"
| 74
| March 25
| @ Phoenix
| 
| 
| 
| 
| Footprint Center
|
|-style="background:#;"
| 75
| March 27
| @ Denver
| 
| 
| 
| 
| Ball Arena
|
|-style="background:#;"
| 76
| March 29
| Dallas
| 
| 
| 
| 
| Wells Fargo Center
|
|-style="background:#;"
| 77
| March 31
| Toronto
| 
| 
| 
| 
| Wells Fargo Center
|

|-style="background:#;"
| 78
| April 2
| @ Milwaukee
| 
| 
| 
| 
| Fiserv Forum
|
|-style="background:#;"
| 79
| April 4
| Boston
| 
| 
| 
| 
| Wells Fargo Center
|
|-style="background:#;"
| 80
| April 6
| Miami
| 
| 
| 
| 
| Wells Fargo Center
|
|-style="background:#;"
| 81
| April 7
| @ Atlanta
| 
| 
| 
| 
| State Farm Arena
|
|-style="background:#;"
| 82
| April 9
| @ Brooklyn
| 
| 
| 
| 
| Barclays Center
|

Transactions

Trades

Free agency

Re-signed

Additions

Subtractions

References 

Philadelphia 76ers seasons
Philadelphia 76ers
Philadelphia 76ers
Philadelphia 76ers